Kessler Stadium is a 4,200-seat football and track stadium in West Long Branch, New Jersey.  It was built in 1993 and is home to the Monmouth University Hawks. Kessler Stadium underwent a massive renovation prior to the start of the 2017 football season that saw the seating capacity expand to more than 4,200 seats, including 800+ chair backs. A brand-new brick facade complements the design of the OceanFirst Bank Center and the seating stretches end zone to end zone. Kessler Stadium is home to a state-of-the-art press box and multimedia center on the third fourth, a main concourse at ground level which is home to the Brockriede Family Concessions and the Austin Family Box Office. On the second floor, the Doherty Family Deck hosts Monmouth Athletics Blue-White Club events.

The first home football game in Monmouth's history was on September 25, 1993, against Sacred Heart University.

See also
 List of NCAA Division I FCS football stadiums

References

External links
 Monmouth sports information department

College football venues
Monmouth Hawks football
Sports venues in New Jersey
West Long Branch, New Jersey
1993 establishments in New Jersey
Sports venues completed in 1993
American football venues in New Jersey
College lacrosse venues in the United States
Lacrosse venues in the United States
College track and field venues in the United States